Uzbyakovo (Üzbäk) is a rural locality (a village) in Zilim-Karanovsky Selsoviet, Gafuriysky District, Bashkortostan, Russia. The population was 374 as of 2010. There are 5 streets.

Geography 
Uzbyakovo is located 46 km north of Krasnousolsky (the district's administrative centre) by road. Maly Utyash is the nearest rural locality.

References 

Rural localities in Gafuriysky District